WLME (102.7 FM, "102.7 The Game") is an American radio station licensed to serve the community of Lewisport, Kentucky. The station is owned and operated by Hancock Communications, Inc., doing business as the Cromwell Radio Group, and the station's broadcast license is held by Hancock Communications, Inc.

WLME broadcasts a sports talk format featuring programming from ESPN Radio to the greater Owensboro, Kentucky, area.

History
The station was assigned call sign WKCM-FM on April 20, 1990. On October 19, 1993, the station changed its call sign to WKCM-FM, on October 20, 1993, to WKCM-FM, on February 20, 1997, to WLME-FM, on April 9, 1997, to WXCM, and on June 9, 1997, to WLME.

References

External links

LME
Sports radio stations in the United States